Danish Greenlanders are ethnic Danes residing in Greenland and their descendants.

Danish Greenlanders are a minority ethnic group in Greenland, accounting for around 11% of the territory's population. Greenlandic Inuit (including mixed-race persons) make up approximately 85%–90% of the total (2009 estimate).

Attracted by good employment opportunities with high wages, many Danes settled in the town of Nuuk during the 1990s. Nuuk has the highest proportion of Danes of any town in Greenland.

History

There was continuous Scandinavian settlement in south-western Greenland from the 10th century until the 15th century. It remains unclear exactly when and how these populations eventually disappeared, but climate change appears to be the primary cause. The majority of these Medieval settlers hailed from Norway (by way of Iceland), rather than Denmark.

From 1721 onwards, the Danish (and Norwegian) presence in south-western Greenland was restored, initially in the form of seasonal trading posts and missions, rather than permanent settlements.

Danish language
Both Danish and Greenlandic have been used in public affairs in Greenland since the establishment of home rule in 1979; the majority of the population can speak both languages. Kalaallisut (Greenlandic) became the sole official language in June 2009. Danish is still widely used in the administration and in higher education, as well as remaining the first or only language for some Danish immigrants in Nuuk and other larger towns. A debate about the role of Kalaallisut (Greenlandic) and Danish in future society is ongoing.

About 12% of the population of Greenland speaks Danish as a first or sole language, particularly Danish immigrants in Greenland, many of whom fill positions such as administrators, professionals, academics, or skilled tradesmen. While Greenlandic is dominant in all smaller settlements, a part of the population of Inuit or mixed ancestry, especially in towns, speaks Danish. Most of the Inuit population speaks Danish as a second language. In larger towns, especially Nuuk and in the higher social strata, this is still a larger group.

See also
 Greenlandic people in Denmark

References 

Greenland
Danish Greenlandic
Greenlandic people of Danish descent
Ethnic groups in Greenland